Below are the results of season six of the World Poker Tour (2007-2008).

Towards the end of season 6 the World Poker Tour announced that they would award a Tiffany designed titanium and diamond championship bracelet for all previous 96 players.

Results

Mirage Poker Showdown

 Casino: The Mirage, Las Vegas
 Buy-in: $10,000
 5-Day Event: May 19, 2007 to May 23, 2007
 Number of Entries: 309
 Total Prize Pool: $2,907,381
 Number of Payouts: 27
 Winning Hand:  Mandalay Bay Poker Championship

 Casino: Mandalay Bay, Las Vegas 
 Buy-in: $10,000
 5-Day Event: May 29, 2007 to June 2, 2007
 Number of Entries: 228
 Total Prize Pool: $2,211,600
 Number of Payouts: 27
 Winning Hand:

Bellagio Cup III

 Casino: Bellagio, Las Vegas 
 Buy-in: $10,000
 6-Day Event: July 10, 2007 to July 15, 2007
 Number of Entries: 535
 Total Prize Pool: $5,189,500
 Number of Payouts: 100
 Winning Hand:

Legends of Poker

 Casino: Bicycle Casino, Los Angeles
 Buy-in: $10,000
 6-Day Event: August 25, 2007 to August 30, 2007
 Number of Entries: 485
 Total Prize Pool: $4,607,500
 Number of Payouts: 45
 Winning Hand:

Gulf Coast Poker Championship

 Casino: Beau Rivage, Biloxi
 Buy-in: $10,000
 4-Day Event: September 6, 2007 to September 9, 2007
 Number of Entries: 256
 Total Prize Pool: $2,463,200
 Number of Payouts: 27
 Winning Hand:

Borgata Poker Open

 Casino: Borgata, Atlantic City
 Buy-in: $10,000
 5-Day Event: September 16, 2007 to September 20, 2007
 Number of Entries: 560
 Total Prize Pool: $5,432,000
 Number of Payouts: 54
 Winning Hand:

Turks & Caicos Poker Classic

 Casino: Players Club, Turks and Caicos Islands
 Buy-in: $7,500
 5-Day Event: September 26, 2007 to September 30, 2007
 Number of Entries: 137
 Total Prize Pool: $996,675
 Number of Payouts: 10
 Winning Hand:

Spanish Championship

 Casino: Casino Barcelona, Barcelona
 Buy-in: €7,500
 5-Day Event: October 11, 2007 to October 16, 2007
 Number of Entries: 226
 Total Prize Pool: €1,665,500
 Number of Payouts: 27
 Winning Hand:

North American Poker Championship

 Casino: Fallsview Casino Resort, Niagara Falls, Ontario, Canada
 Buy-in: Can$10,000
 8-Day Event: October 26, 2007 to November 2, 2007
 Number of Entries: 504
 Total Prize Pool: Can$5,133,335 (US$5,305,060)
 Number of Payouts: 45
 Winning Hand:

World Poker Finals

 Casino: Foxwoods, Mashantucket, Connecticut
 Buy-in: $10,000
 7-Day Event: November 7, 2007 to November 13, 2007
 Number of Entries: 575
 Total Prize Pool: $5,404,075
 Number of Payouts: 50
 Winning Hand:

Doyle Brunson Classic Championship

 Casino: Bellagio, Las Vegas 
 Buy-in: $15,000
 7-Day Event: December 12, 2007 to December 18, 2007
 Number of Entries: 626
 Total Prize Pool: $9,390,000
 Number of Payouts: 100
 Winning Hand:

World Poker Open

 Casino: Gold Strike Resort and Casino, Tunica
 Buy-in: $10,000
 5-Day Event: January 20, 2008 to January 24, 2008
 Number of Entries: 259
 Total Prize Pool: $2,512,300
 Number of Payouts: 27
 Winning Hand:

Borgata Winter Open

 Casino: Borgata, Atlantic City 
 Buy-in: $10,000
 5-Day Event: January 27, 2008 to January 31, 2008
 Number of Entries: 507
 Total Prize Pool: $4,917,900
 Number of Payouts: 54
 Winning Hand:

L.A. Poker Classic

 Casino: Commerce Casino, Los Angeles 
 Buy-in: $10,000
 6-Day Event: February 23, 2008 to February 28, 2008
 Number of Entries: 665
 Total Prize Pool: $6,288,000
 Number of Payouts: 63
 Winning Hand:

L.A. Poker Classic
 Casino: Commerce Casino, Los Angeles
 Buy-in:
 2-Day Event: March 1, 2008
 Number of Entries: 445
 Total Prize Pool:
 Number of Payouts:
 Winning Hand:

Bay 101 Shooting Star

 Casino: Bay 101, San Jose, California
 Buy-in: $10,000
 5-Day Event: March 10, 2008 to March 14, 2008
 Number of Entries: 376
 Total Prize Pool: $3,336,000
 Number of Payouts: 45
 Winning Hand:

World Poker Challenge

 Casino: Reno Hilton, Reno
 Buy-in: $7,500
 4-Day Event: March 25, 2008 to March 28, 2008
 Number of Entries: 261
 Total Prize Pool: $1,873,275
 Number of Payouts: 27
 Winning Hand:

Foxwoods Poker Classic

 Casino: Foxwoods, Mashantucket, Connecticut 
 Buy-in: $10,000
 6-Day Event: April 4, 2008 to April 9, 2008
 Number of Entries: 346
 Total Prize Pool: $3,230,014
 Number of Payouts: 40
 Winning Hand:

WPT Championship

 Casino: Bellagio, Las Vegas 
 Buy-in: $25,000
 7-Day Event: April 19, 2008 to April 26, 2008
 Number of Entries: 545
 Total Prize Pool: $13,216,250
 Number of Payouts: 100
 Winning Hand:

Other Events
During season 6 of the WPT there was one special event that did not apply to the Player of the Year standings:
 The WPT Celebrity Invitational - March 1–3, 2008 - Commerce Casino - postscript to Event #14: L.A. Poker Classic

References

World Poker Tour
2007 in poker
2008 in poker